Beidiao 993  ( 993) is an experimental ship chartered by the Chinese People's Liberation Army Navy (PLAN), and operated by the 760th Research Institute of China Shipbuilding Industry Corporation (CSIC), receiving NATO reporting name Kantan勘探 in Chinese, meaning Exploration.

Beidiao 993 is specifically designed to carry out experiments of acoustic equipment, such as sonar, and its crew is often composed both naval and civilian staff. Constructed by the Tongfang Jiangxin Shipbuilding Company (同方江新造船有限公司) in Jiangxi, trials begun in December 2000 in Dalian and the ship entered service in the same month. In addition to support sonar development, this ship is also equipped to perform various other research tasks and thus also received hull classification of general scientific research ship (AGE/AG).The name Beidiao means North (Sea Fleet) Investigation (Ship).

References

2000 ships
Ships built in China
Naval ships of the People's Republic of China
Auxiliary ships of the People's Liberation Army Navy